The 1934 Home Nations Championship was the thirtieth series of the rugby union Home Nations Championship. Including the previous incarnations as the Five Nations, and prior to that, the Home Nations, this was the forty-seventh series of the northern hemisphere rugby union championship. Six matches were played between 20 January and 17 March. It was contested by England, Ireland, Scotland and Wales. It was the first time since the 1913 competition that the table finished without any team tying for places.

Table

Results

External links

1934
Home Nations
Home Nations
Home Nations
Home Nations
Home Nations
Home Nations Championship
Home Nations Championship
Home Nations Championship